The Benthoscope was a deep sea submersible designed by Otis Barton after the Second World War. He hired the Watson-Stillman Company, who had earlier constructed his and William Beebe's bathysphere to produce the new design of deep diving vessel, which was named from the Greek benthos, meaning "bottom".

Two windows of fused quartz were installed, one facing straight ahead and the other diagonally down. Other arrangements followed the bathysphere, with oxygen supplied from cylinders, and calcium chloride and soda lime used to absorb moisture and CO2 respectively.

The Benthoscope is now on display in front of the Los Angeles Maritime Museum in San Pedro, California.

See also
 
 
 
 

Crewed submersibles